Scabiosa graminifolia, grass-leaved scabious is a species of scabious found in the Mediterranean region. The plant grows on rocky slopes. As its name indicates, this species has grass-like leaves. Its flowers are pink or lilac and open in summer.

References

graminifolia